Roger Federer defeated Fernando González in the final, 7–5, 6–1, 6–0 to win the singles tennis title at the 2006 Madrid Open. He did not drop a set during the tournament.

Rafael Nadal was the defending champion, but lost in the quarterfinals to Tomáš Berdych.

This tournament marked the first professional-level match played between Novak Djokovic and Andy Murray, who would go on to play a total of 36 ATP Tour-level matches against each other; Djokovic won their third-round encounter.

Seeds
A champion seed is indicated in bold text while text in italics indicates the round in which that seed was eliminated. All sixteen seeds received a bye into the second round.

Draw

Finals

Top half

Section 1

Section 2

Bottom half

Section 3

Section 4

References 
 2006 Mutua Madrilena Masters Madrid Draw
 2006 Mutua Madrilena Masters Madrid Qualifying Draw

Singles